Capone is a 2020 American biographical drama film written, directed and edited by Josh Trank, with Tom Hardy starring as the eponymous gangster Al Capone. The film centers on Capone after his 11-year sentence at Atlanta Penitentiary, as he suffers from neurosyphilis and dementia while living in Florida. Linda Cardellini, Jack Lowden, Noel Fisher, Kyle MacLachlan, and Matt Dillon also star in supporting roles. First announced in October 2016 as Fonzo, production on the film did not begin until March 2018, lasting through May in Louisiana.

Originally intended to have a theatrical release, Capone was released through Premium VOD by Vertical Entertainment and Redbox Entertainment on May 12, 2020, due to the COVID-19 pandemic. The film received mixed reviews from critics, with Hardy's performance earning some praise while Trank's script and the film's uneven tone were criticized.

Plot 
Once the most feared bootlegger in Chicago, mobster Al Capone is brought down when he is convicted of tax evasion. At the age of 40, following nearly a decade of imprisonment, he is released after the government deems him to no longer be a threat as his mind is slowly rotting from untreated neurosyphilis.

Retired and living with his family in Palm Island, Florida, Capone remains under surveillance by FBI agents, as they think he may be faking his insanity. Forced to sell many of his remaining belongings to pay old debts and support himself, Capone begins to have hallucinations and loses control of his motor functions and explosive bowel movements as his disease progresses. He acknowledges that he hid $10 million before he was convicted, although he cannot remember where it is.

After Capone, whose memory is nearly gone, has a physical confrontation with his wife Mae, she instructs her husband's bodyguards to keep everyone away from him. Meanwhile, Capone has increasingly debilitating visions of the men he killed and many of the violent acts he committed. His mental capacity continues to deteriorate, until a psychiatrist hired to evaluate him declares that his IQ is no more than that of a child. Wracked with guilt, and having alienated all around him, Capone eventually dies of complications from his syphilis in January 1947 at the age of 48. His surviving family changes their name from Capone, and the money he allegedly hid away has never been recovered.

Cast 
 Tom Hardy as Al Capone
 Linda Cardellini as Mae Capone
 Matt Dillon as Johnny Torrio
 Al Sapienza as Ralph Capone
 Kathrine Narducci as Rosie
 Noel Fisher as Junior
 Gino Cafarelli as Gino
 Mason Guccione as Tony
 Caiden Acurio as Vince
 Jack Lowden as Stirling H. Crawford, Agent FBI
 Kyle MacLachlan as Dr. Karlock
 Josh Trank as Agent Clifford M. Harris
 Neal Brennan as Harold Mattingly
 Edgar Arreola as Rodrigo
 Manuel Fajardo Jr. as Zambini

Production 
It was announced in October 2016 that Tom Hardy would star as Al Capone in the film, then known as Fonzo, which would be directed, written and edited by Josh Trank. Filming was initially eyed to begin in the summer of 2017, with Hardy stating it would be released sometime in 2018. Hardy instead ended up filming Venom in 2017, and in March 2018 announced Fonzo as his next project. Later that month, Linda Cardellini, Matt Dillon, Kyle MacLachlan, Kathrine Narducci, Jack Lowden, Noel Fisher and Tilda Del Toro joined the cast.

Filming began on March 19, 2018 in New Orleans, and lasted through May 15.

On April 15, 2020, the trailer was released with its new title, Capone.

Rapper and producer El-P composed the score for the film, which was released by Milan Records.

Release 
On May 12, 2020 Vertical Entertainment and Redbox Entertainment released the film digitally in the United States and Canada through Premium video on demand. The film was originally set to have a theatrical release, but these plans changed due to movie theater closures that started in mid-March because of the COVID-19 pandemic restrictions. The film received a theatrical release in several regions such as Iceland, Lithuania and Portugal, where it has grossed a combined $112,116.

Reception

VOD sales
In its first few days of release, Capone was the number-two rented film on iTunes. Over its first weekend, it ranked third on iTunes and fourth on both FandangoNow and Google Play. Over its first ten days the film made $2.5 million from digital sales, a record for Vertical Entertainment. IndieWire called the results "quite good" but "far from being a money-[maker]", saying that Vertical would see about 75% of the initial gross ($1.5 million), and that the film could leg out to $4–5 million in sales. In its second weekend of release the film fell to 11th on iTunes and seventh on Fandango. The weekend of August 7, upon lowering the price to $0.99, the film was the second-most rented on the iTunes Store and Apple TV.

Critical response
The website's consensus reads: "Tom Hardy makes the most of his opportunity to tackle a challenging role, but Capone is too haphazardly constructed to support his fascinating performance." On Metacritic, the film has a weighted average score of 46 out of 100, based on 37 critics, indicating "mixed or average reviews".

Writing for TheWrap, Steve Pond said: "It's nuts, it's a mess and it's pretty damn entertaining if you don't mind characters pooping the bed and getting stabbed in the neck", saying that "Tom Hardy laughs in the face of conventional notions of good v. bad acting." Scout Tafoya writing for Consequence of Sound gave the film an A− grade and noted that "Somehow, Trank had energy left over, despite wrangling one of the most eccentric performers working, to make a satisfying haunted house film as well" and called it "one of the most bravely singular and uncommon films you'll see this year."

Owen Gleiberman of Variety called the film "the last half hour of The Irishman crossed with the doddering-legend parts of Citizen Kane" and said that Hardy gives "a mumbly Method showboat performance that's authentic on the surface, but there isn't enough beneath the mob mannerisms." David Ehrlich of IndieWire gave the film a "C−" grade and wrote: "Nevertheless, the director and his subject are ultimately buried together in the same boat: We're made to understand their suffering, but given no reason to root for their salvation."

References

External links 
 Capone at redbox.
 Capone at BRON Studios
 
Capone at Rotten Tomatoes

2020 films
2020 biographical drama films
2020 crime drama films
American biographical drama films
American crime drama films
Films about Al Capone
Biographical films about criminals
Films about organized crime in the United States
Films about syphilis
Films directed by Josh Trank
Films not released in theaters due to the COVID-19 pandemic
Films produced by Lawrence Bender
Films set in the 1940s
Films set in 1947
Films set in Florida
Films shot in New Orleans
Films with screenplays by Josh Trank
Vertical Entertainment films
2020s English-language films
2020s American films